Embedsky Mini-PC E8 is a  postcard sized (100 mm x 65 mm) single-board computer, developed by Guangzhou Embedsky Computer Tech Company.

It features a 32-bit microcomputer processor, as well as many peripheral interfaces similar to personal computers such as power connector, audio interfaces, both VGA and HDMI outputs, a network port, and USB interfaces for connecting WiFi and Bluetooth dongles, a keyboard, and a mouse. It uses A8 kernel, 1 GHz frequency, a built-in SGX540 graphics processor, a 512MB DDR2 storage, and 4GB eMMC FLASH memory. Most notably, it supports Android 4.0.4, as well as Ubuntu 12.04 and Windows CE6 operating systems.

References 

Computing by computer model